= Artists in Residence =

Artists in Residence is a 2025 documentary film that explores the lives of three female artists; Lois Dodd, Eleanor Magid, and Louise Kruger, who in the 1950s, purchased a house together in New York City..
